Klymets is a selo (village) in Stryi Raion, Lviv Oblast, of western Ukraine. More specifically, it is located in the Ukrainian Carpathians, within the limits of the Eastern Beskids (Skole Beskids) in southwestern part of the oblast. Klymets belongs to Kozova rural hromada, one of the hromadas of Ukraine.

Local government — Klymetska village council.

History 
The first written record indicates that the date of foundation is considered to be 1565.

There is other information: the village was established by German colonialists, which in Austrian times founded a colony Karlsdorf (German for Karl's village). The colony existed before the Second World War.

Przemyśl Lands, including Skole District mercilessly suffered from attacks that have been from Tatar-Mongol invasion of Kievan Rus' at this time. The massive flight of peasants was observed at the beginning of the 18th century.

At the beginning of the 18th century, during the Austrian Empire (since 1867 Austria-Hungary), Skole District and other regions of the Austrian-held Carpathians began to colonize German craftsmen (see Galician Germans). This led to the development of industry and trade in land.

During the war, Klymets was situated at the border between Hungary and Ukraine. According to field research, approximately 12 Jews were murdered by the Germans in the summer of 1942.

Until 18 July 2020, Klymets belonged to Skole Raion. The raion was abolished in July 2020 as part of the administrative reform of Ukraine, which reduced the number of raions of Lviv Oblast to seven. The area of Skole Raion was merged into Stryi Raion.

Notes

External links 
  (Slownik geograficzny Krolestwa Polskiego i innych krajow slowianskich. Tom XII. Warszawa, 1886)

Literature 
  Page 716.

Villages in Stryi Raion
Holocaust locations in Ukraine